Lac Dummy is a lake in Outaouais, Quebec, Canada.

References

Lakes of Outaouais